Ouchard is a family of French violin bow makers. The principal figures were:
 Émile François Ouchard (1872–1951), known as Ouchard Père
 Émile Auguste Ouchard (1900–1969), his son
 Bernard Ouchard (1925–1979), his son

French musical instrument makers